{{Infobox weapon
| name               = Maxim gun
| image              = File:Polish Legions picnic, Łódź October 2014 08.jpg
| image_size         = 300
| caption            = Maxim M1910 variant
| is_ranged          = yes 
| type               = Heavy machine gun
| origin             = United Kingdom
| service            = 1886 – present
| used_by            = See Users
| wars               = {{Plainlist|
 Mahdist War
 Emin Pasha Relief Expedition
 Yoni Expedition
 Adamawa Wars
 Bafut Wars
 Samoan Civil War
 Abushiri Revolt
 Dervish Resistance
 Buganda civil wars
 First Matabele War
 First Sino-Japanese War
 Fourth Anglo-Ashanti War 
 Chitral Expedition
 Jameson Raid
 Second Matabele War
 Second Boer War
 Boxer Rebellion
 Philippine Revolution
 Spanish–American War
 War of the Golden Stool
 Anglo–Aro War
 British expedition to Tibet
 Russo-Japanese War
 Persian Constitutional Revolution
 Herero War
 Philippine–American War
 1907 Honduran Conflict
 Maji Maji Rebellion
 Sokehs Rebellion 
 Mexican Revolution
 Balkan Wars
 Contestado War
 World War I
 Russian Civil War
 Finnish Civil War
 Estonian War of Independence
 Polish–Soviet War
 Paraguayan Civil War (1922)
 Constitutionalist Revolution<ref>Cotta, Francis Albert as trincheiras da mantiqueira: os embates da Brigada Sul na Revolução Constitucionalista"</ref>
 Chaco War
 Second Sino-Japanese War
 World War II
 Chinese Civil War
 Korean War
 War in Donbas 
 2022 Russian invasion of Ukraine 
}}

| designer           = Sir Hiram Stevens Maxim
| design_date        = 
| manufacturer       = Maxim Gun Company, Vickers
| number             = 
| variants           = Vickers machine gun, MG08, PM M1910, M32-33, M/09-21
| weight             = 27.2 kg (60 lb)
| length             = 107.9 cm (42.5 in)
| part_length        = 67.3 cm (26.5 in)
| width              = 
| height             = 
| crew               = 4
| cartridge          = 
| caliber            = 
| action             = Recoil-operated
| rate               = 550–600 rounds/min
| velocity           = 744 m/s
| range              = 
| max_range          = 
| feed               = 250-round canvas belt
| sights             = Iron sights
}}

The Maxim gun is a recoil-operated machine gun invented in 1884 by Hiram Stevens Maxim. It was the first fully automatic machine gun in the world.

The Maxim gun has been called "the weapon most associated with imperial conquest" by historian Martin Gilbert, and was heavily used by colonial powers during the "Scramble for Africa". Afterwards, Maxim guns also saw extensive usage by different armies during the Russo-Japanese War, the First and Second World Wars, as well as by insurgent groups in contemporary conflicts.

The Maxim gun was greatly influential in the development of machine guns, and it has multiple variants and derivatives.

 Design 

The Maxim gun featured one of the earliest recoil-operated firing systems in history. Energy from recoil acting on the breech block is used to eject each spent cartridge and insert the next one. Maxim's earliest designs used a 360-degree rotating cam to reverse the movement of the block, but this was later simplified to a toggle lock. This made it vastly more efficient and less labor-intensive than previous rapid-firing guns, such as the manually cranked Mitrailleuse, Gatling, Gardner, or Nordenfelt.

The Maxim gun was water cooled, allowing it to sustain its rate of fire far longer than air-cooled guns. The extra weight and complexity this added, however, made it heavier and less flexible in use.

Trials demonstrated that the Maxim could fire 600 rounds per minute. Compared to modern machine guns, the Maxim was heavy, bulky, and awkward. A lone soldier could fire the weapon, but it was usually operated by a team of men, usually 4 to 6. Apart from the gunner, other crew were needed to speed reload, spot targets, and carry and ready ammunition and water. Several men were needed to move or mount the heavy weapon.

 Production company 
A blue plaque on the Factory where Maxim invented and produced the gun is to be found in Hatton Garden at the junction with Clerkenwell Road in London.

Albert Vickers became the company's chairman, and it later joined hands with a Swedish competitor, Nordenfelt, to become Maxim Nordenfelt Guns and Ammunition Company. The Post Office Directory of trades in London of 1895 lists its office at 32 Victoria Street SW (London) on page 1579.

Finally, the company was absorbed into the mother Vickers company, leading first to the Maxim-Vickers gun and then, after Vickers' redesign, the Vickers machine gun.

 History 
 Development (1883–1884) 
Maxim's first British patents relating to the development of the Maxim gun were granted in June and July 1883. The first prototype was demonstrated to invited guests in October 1884.

 Use in colonial warfare (1886–1914) 

A prototype of the Maxim gun was given by Hiram Maxim to the Emin Pasha Relief Expedition in 1886–1890, under the leadership of Henry Morton Stanley. More a publicity stunt than a serious military contribution, in view of the main financier of the expedition, William Mackinnon, "merely exhibiting" the gun was likely to "prove a great peace-preserver". The weapon was used on several occasions, especially during the expedition's retreat from central Africa, not because of its devastating effects, but as an effective means to scare off attackers. One of the first uses of the Maxim gun by British Forces was in the 1887 Yoni Expedition. The same prototype used by Stanley was brought back to central Africa by Frederick Lugard, where it played an instrumental role in the establishment of the Uganda Protectorate.

The first unit in the world to receive the Maxim was the expeditionary force led by Hermann Wissmann which was sent in 1888 by the German Imperial government to its colonies in East Africa to suppress the Abushiri Revolt. Wissmann was issued one of the first Maxim guns which had reached Germany and used it successfully in his capture of Pangani.

The Singapore Volunteer Corps received a Maxim gun in 1889, but it was never used. This was a civilian volunteer defence unit on the British colony.

The Maxim gun was first used extensively in an African conflict during the First Matabele War in Rhodesia. During the Battle of the Shangani, 700 soldiers fought off 5,000 Matabele warriors with just five Maxim guns. It played an important role in the "Scramble for Africa" in the late 19th century. The extreme lethality was employed to devastating effect against obsolete charging tactics, when African opponents could be lured into pitched battles in open terrain. As it was put by Hilaire Belloc, in the words of the figure "Blood" in his poem "The Modern Traveller":

However, the destructive power of the Maxim gun in colonial warfare has often been embellished by popular myth. Modern historical accounts suggest that, while it was effective in pitched battles, as in the Matabele wars or the Battle of Omdurman, its significance owed much to its psychological impact.

A larger-calibre version of the Maxim, firing a one-pound shell, was built by Maxim-Nordenfeldt. This was known in the Second Boer War (in South Africa) as the Pom-Pom from its sound. The Boers' "one-pounder" Maxim-Nordenfeldt was a large caliber, belt-fed, water-cooled "auto cannon" that fired explosive rounds (smokeless ammunition) at 450 rounds per minute.

The Maxim gun was also used in the Anglo-Aro War (in present-day Nigeria) of 1901–1902.

National and military authorities were reluctant to adopt the weapon, and Maxim's company initially had some trouble convincing European governments of the weapon's efficiency. Soldiers generally held a great mistrust of machine guns due to their tendency to jam. In the 1906 version of his book Small Wars, Charles Callwell says of machine guns: "The older forms are not suitable as a rule... they jammed at Ulundi, they jammed at Dogali, they jammed at Abu Klea and Tofrek, in some cases with unfortunate results." However, the Maxim was far more reliable than its contemporaries. A more immediate problem was that, initially, its position was easily given away by the clouds of smoke that the gun produced (although the same was true of artillery pieces and units of troops that the machine gun was intended to replace or supplement, so this wasn't viewed as a particular drawback by the early users). The advent of smokeless powder (developed by, among others, Hiram's brother Hudson Maxim), helped to change this.

The weapon was adopted by the British Army under the guidance of Sir Garnet Wolseley, who had been appointed Commander-in-Chief of the British Army in 1888. In October that year, he placed an order of 120 rifle-calibre Maxims using the same .577/450 ammunition as the Martini–Henry rifles. Wolseley had previously led military expeditions in Africa (the Ashanti war and the Gordon Relief Expedition in 1884–85) and had a reputation for being a strong subscriber to military innovation and reform, which he demonstrated in Africa. There he used machine guns, explored other unconventional ideas, and founded an Egyptian camel corps.

The gun's design was also purchased and used by several other European countries.

 Russo-Japanese War 
In 1895, the Imperial Japanese Army purchased a number of Maxims but later decided to standardize on the Hotchkiss machine gun. The Imperial Russian Army likewise purchased 58 Maxim machine guns in 1899 and contracted with Vickers in 1902 to manufacture the design in Russia, although manufacturing did not start until 1910. During the Russo-Japanese War of 1904–1905, the Russian Army employed the Maxim in combat and placed a rush order for another 450 units from overseas suppliers, which were mostly delivered to front-line troops before the end of the war.

 World War I (1914–1918) 
By World War I, many armies had moved on to improved machine guns. The British Vickers machine gun was an improved and redesigned Maxim, introduced into the British Army in 1912 and remaining in service until 1968. Production took place at Erith in Kent, and some models were fitted to early biplanes also fabricated there. The German Army's Maschinengewehr 08 and the Russian Pulemyot Maxim were both more or less direct copies of the Maxim.

It also saw use during the Russian Civil War, which followed the Revolution in 1917. A picture of the period depicts a Maxim gun mounted on a tachanka, a horse-drawn carriage, along with the gunner, firing backwards at a pursuing White Army regiment. Anarchists attribute this mobile setup to Nestor Makhno.

 American use 

The United States Army had shown interest in the Maxim machine gun since 1887. Model 1889 and Model 1900 Maxims were used for testing, which lasted for years but not continuously. The gun was finally adopted in 1904 as the Maxim Machine Gun, Caliber .30, Model of 1904 as the first rifle-caliber heavy machine gun for standard service in the U.S. Army. The design was characteristic for its visually distinctive cage-like muzzle recoil booster designed by Trevor Dawson and J. Ramsay of Vickers.

The first 50 guns and tripods were made by Vickers, Sons & Maxim in the U.K. chambered for .30-03. Colt's Manufacturing Company was selected to produce it domestically, but challenges with schematics and specifications delayed its introduction. By the time Colt began production in 1908 (which was also the last year orders were placed for the guns), a total of 90 M1904s were made by Vickers. Colt made their machine guns for the new .30-06 caliber, and the ones made by Vickers were re-chambered for the new round. A total of 287 M1904 Maxims were manufactured. The U.S. procured other machine guns after M1904 production ended, including the M1909 Benét–Mercié, the Colt–Vickers M1915, and the Browning M1917.

M1904 Maxims were issued to infantry companies and cavalry. Each company had four guns with associated tripods, ammunition, and 20 mules to transport the heavy guns. The M1904 was deployed in operations in the Philippines, Hawaii, Mexico, and Central and South America, but never saw much combat use. During World War I, it remained in the U.S. for training.

 Russo-Ukrainian War 
The Maxim, in the form of the PM M1910, saw use by both sides during the 2022 Russo-Ukrainian War, introducing modifications to the century-old machine gun that redefined its intended use. These changes included its inclusion on Technicals and the introduction of Red dot sights.

One is being used by Ukrainian forces in the Battle of Bakhmut. The weapon is still fitted with its original iron wheels and has no obvious modifications. A Ukrainian soldier told the BBC: "It only works when there is a massive attack going on…then it really works. So we use it every week".

 Variants and derivatives 

 Maxim five-barrel machine gun, fed from overhead inserted magazines and later belt-fed.
 Vickers machine gun: earlier Maxims had been chambered for earlier British service cartridges, but the Vickers was produced for export available in most of the different calibres and cartridges used by countries around the world, and including a large caliber (.50 inch) as used on Royal Navy warships. The machine gun was  lighter and had been tested by the Army in 1909.
 Maschinengewehr 01, made by Deutsche Waffen und Munitionsfabriken (DWM)
 MG 08 derived from MG 01
 Its export version MG 09, featuring the naval tripod mount of the MG 08 instead of the sled
 German indigenous derivatives (e.g., MG 08/15)
 Type 24 heavy machine gun, Chinese variant of MG 09
 Maschinengewehr Modell 1911, Swiss variant of the MG 09 made by Waffenfabrik Bern
 Russian/Soviet Pulemyot Maxima PM1910 and lighter variants Maxim–Tokarev and PV-1 machine gun
 Finnish Maxim M09/21 and Maxim M/32-33
 American M1904
 Romanian-made 6.5 mm version, at least 8–12 were produced and were used by the Romanian Danube Flotilla during World War I
 MG 18 TuF Anti-tank & Anti-aircraft gun

 Users 
 
 
 
 
 
 
 
 
 
 
 
 
 
 
 
 : By 1912 the army had 12 maxims; 50 more were ordered during the Balkan wars but it is not known if they arrived in time
 
 
 
  (1918–1940, .303 and other versions)
 
 
 : Used in the Battle of Namasique against the forces of Honduran General Manuel Bonilla
 : Six 577/450 Maxim guns mounted on Field Carriages Mk I were purchased in 1896; they were converted to .303 after 1899. Two of these took part in the  Dog Tax War. 29 .303 calliber guns were purchased from Vickers Sons & Maxim in 1901 on Dundonald Galloping Carriages. In 1910 36 guns were ordered on Mk IV tripods with pack saddlery and stores but only arrived in 1913. When the tripods arrived the carriages were scrapped. However initially due to the delay in converting the guns to tripod mounting only one gun was issued to each of the 29 regiments. The New Zealand Mounted Rifles formed a Maxim Gun Battery with British-supplied guns during the Boer War.  New Zealand Forces entered WW I with older Maxim machineguns and 36 new ones.
 
 
 
 
  Qajar Dynasty: Had a battery of four guns in the 1890s. Also used during the Constitutional Revolution
 
 
 
 
 
 
 
 
 
 

 See also 
 Caldwell machine gun
 Fittipaldi machine gun
 Hotchkiss machine gun
 Kjellman machine gun
 M1917 Browning machine gun
 Nordenfelt gun
 Perino Model 1908
 QF 1-pounder pom-pom
 St. Étienne Mle 1907

 Citations 

 General sources 
 Anon., Vickers, Sons and Maxim Limited: Their Works and Manufactures. (Reprinted from 'Engineering')'' London (1898). It gives plates showing the mechanism of the Vickers Maxim gun and numerous plates showing the variety of mounts available at the end of the 19th century. It also includes numerous plates of the factories in which they were made.
  This is a reprint of the 1906 version.
  (See chapter 3: "Hiram Maxim Changes War")

External links 

 Handbook of the Maxim Automatic Machine Gun, caliber .30, model of 1904, with pack outfits and accessories. US War Department, July 1916
 The Maxim Machine Gun Systems Blueprints by 1906
 Animation of Maxim's prototype machine gun, 1884
 Animation of Maxim's second prototype machine gun 1885
 Animation of Maxim's transitional machine gun 1885

Early machine guns
Machine guns of the United Kingdom
Short recoil firearms
Victorian-era weapons of the United Kingdom
Weapons and ammunition introduced in 1886
Weapons of the Ottoman Empire
World War I infantry weapons of the United States
World War I infantry weapons
World War I machine guns